Bishop Thomas Grant School (BTG) is a coeducational Roman Catholic secondary school and sixth form, situated in the Streatham area of the London Borough of Lambeth, England.

The school is named after the first Bishop of Southwark, Thomas Grant (1816-1870) who was named in the First Vatican Council. The school was opened on 9 September 1959. BTG is a specialist school in Mathematics and ICT. In September 2009 Bishop Thomas Grant re-opened their sixth form which had closed in 1986. In their 2014 Ofsted inspection, BTG received a mark of outstanding in every category.

Notable alumni

 Giosue Bellagambi, footballer
 Nathaniel Chalobah, footballer
 Trevoh Chalobah, footballer
 Nathaniel Clyne,  footballer
 Ben Cross, actor
 Clare Lukehurst, lecturer and agro-energy consultant 
 George Ndah, footballer
 Toni Slabas, plant biochemist
 Viv Solomon, footballer

References

External links

Secondary schools in the London Borough of Lambeth
Catholic secondary schools in the Archdiocese of Southwark
Educational institutions established in 1959
1959 establishments in England
Voluntary aided schools in London
Streatham